The Waeve (stylised as The WAEVE) is the debut studio album by the band of the same name, a duo consisting of English singer-songwriters Graham Coxon and Rose Elinor Dougall. The album was released 3 February 2023 by Transgressive Records.

Background 
The duo and album were first announced 20 April 2022 along with a standalone single called "Here Comes the Waeve". They also announced the lead single "Something Pretty" on that day; the single released on 5 May. Four more singles were released prior to the album: "Can I Call You" on 6 September, "Drowning" on 24 October, "Kill Me Again" on 29 November, and "Over and Over" on 19 January 2023. Music videos were released for "Can I Call You" and "Kill Me Again", both directed by David J. East.

Coxon and Dougall first met in December 2020 at a fundraiser for the Lebanese Red Cross at the Jazz Café in Camden Town, London where Coxon performed. The two subsequently started dating and had a baby girl together. The duo's name was inspired by an old English spelling of the word "sea" as "S-A-E", pointing to their English folk music inspiration, water-centric lyrics, and "a kind of reconciliation of feeling at odds with what [was] happening in" the United Kingdom at the time.

When the two got together to write, Coxon took the opportunity to write music that "people wouldn't necessarily expect from him, something with 'rich chord progressions.'" Neither expected their sessions to lead to enough songs for a full album, as they went into the process without any planning, just being happy to work "at their own pace, with no label, management or producer looking over their shoulder." While Dougall said "it just wouldn't be right" if the album didn't contain Coxon's guitar playing, it was his work on the saxophone, an instrument he is classically trained in, which "really helped to shape the multi-angled outline" of the album. Coxon engineered most of the album before the duo brought on James Ford to finish the record. Ford made significant changes such as replacing the duo's synthesiser recordings with real string instruments and adding other sounds including a flute. Other instruments on the record include a cittern and a six string bass once owned by Sly and the Family Stone's Larry Graham. Dougall took vocal inspiration from singers such as Anne Briggs, Sandy Denny and Karen Dalton.

When asked for a list of albums that inspired The Waeve in an interview with BrooklynVegan, Coxon named Talk Talk's Laughing Stock, King Crimson's In the Court of the Crimson King, Gong's Camembert Electrique, Irma Thomas's The Soul Queen of New Orleans, Van der Graaf Generator's Still Life, and Martin Carthy's Right of Passage; and Dougall named Broadcast's Tender Buttons, Fairport Convention's Unhalfbricking, Young Marble Giants's Colossal Youth, and Penguin Cafe Orchestra's Signs of Life.

Reception

Track listing

Personnel 
 Graham Coxon – lead vocals, saxophone, guitar, producer, recording engineer
 Rose Elinor Dougall – lead vocals, producer
 James Ford – mixing engineer, additional production, additional instruments
 Elysian Quartet – strings

Charts

References 

2023 debut albums
The Waeve albums
Transgressive Records albums